Rishabh Yadav (born 13 August 2002 in Gurugram, Haryana, India) is a compound archer from India. At the 2021 World Archery Youth Championships at Wrocław, Poland, he won the bronze medal in the men's compound archery event. On 17 November 2021, he won the bronze medal in the men's compound archery team event along with Abhishek Verma and Aman Saini and a silver medal in the mixed team event with Jyothi Surekha Vennam at the 22nd Asian Archery Championship in Dhaka, Bangladesh.

Career 
Rishabh earned two silver medals in individual and men's team categories at Archery Asia Cup 2022 Stage 1 in Thailand. He further secured a gold and silver medal in men's team and individual categories at Archery Asia Cup Stage 2 in Iraq. He also represented India at Senior World Archery Championship 2022 in USA.

See also 

 Indian Archers
 Archery in India

References

External links 

 

Living people
2002 births
Indian male archers
Place of birth missing (living people)
Sportspeople from Haryana
21st-century Indian people